Marjorie 'Marge' A. Chadderdon (born December 1, 1937) was a Republican Idaho State Representative from 2004 to 2012 representing District 4 in the A seat.

Early life 
On December 1, 1937, Chadderdon was born in Poplar, Montana.

Education 
In 1957, Chadderdon earned an Associate degree in education College of Great Falls. Chadderdon attended Gonzaga University.

Career 
In 1957, Chadderdon was a bookkeeper of Occident Grain Elevators, until 1958.

In 1966, Chadderdon became a co-owner of Carpet Center Stores, until 1996. In 1967, Chadderdon was an office manager of Prestiges Carpets, until 1972.

In 1975. Chadderdon became a co-owner, treasurer, and secretary of C & S Textile, Incorporated until 1996.

In 1978, Chadderdon became an office manager of Carpet Center Stores, until 1993.

In 1979, Chadderdon started her political career as a council member of Fernan Village, until 1983.

Elections

2010 
Chadderdon was unopposed in the Republican primary.  Chadderon defeated Democratic nominee Mike Bullard with 61.9% of the vote.

2008 
Chadderdon was unopposed in the Republican primary. Chadderdon defeated Democratic nominee Tamara Lee Poelstra with 58% of the vote in the general election.

2006 
Chadderdon was unopposed in the Republican primary election. Chadderdon defeated Democratic nominee Bonnie Douglas with 53.51% of the vote in the general election.

2004 
Chadderdon defeated Jim Hollingsworth with 55.87% of the votes in the Republican primary Chadderdon defeated Democratic nominee Mike Gridley with 53.7% of the vote in the general election.

References

External links
Marge Chadderdon at the Idaho Legislature
 

1937 births
Living people
Gonzaga University alumni
Republican Party members of the Idaho House of Representatives
People from Coeur d'Alene, Idaho
People from Poplar, Montana
Women state legislators in Idaho
21st-century American women politicians